MacNeil can have a number of different meanings and spellings:

Clan MacNeil is a Scottish clan.

Notable people 
Al MacNeil (born 1935), Canadian hockey player
Angus MacNeil (born 1970), Scottish politician
Archibald Macneil of Colonsay (fl. 1773–1805), Scottish laird
Bernie MacNeil (born 1950), Canadian ice hockey player
Bhreagh MacNeil, Canadian actress
Brett MacNeil (born 1967), Canadian gridiron football player
Carol Brooks MacNeil (1871–1944), American sculptor
Carole MacNeil (born 1964), Canadian television journalist
Charles Grant MacNeil (1892–1976), Canadian politician
Chuck MacNeil (born 1944), Canadian politician
Colin MacNeil, British comics artist
Colin MacNeil (footballer) (born 1936), Australian rules footballer
Cooper MacNeil (born 1992), American racecar driver
Cornell MacNeil (1922–2011), American baritone
Donald C. MacNeil (1924–1978), Canadian politician
Drew MacNeil (born 1964), Scottish shinty player
Flora MacNeil (1928–2015), Scottish Gaelic singer
Heather MacNeil, Canadian archivist
Hermon Atkins MacNeil (1866–1947), American sculptor
Hugh MacNeil (1860–1924), New Zealand cricketer, golfer and businessman
Hugh Livingstone Macneil (1850–1901), Canadian pioneer ranch and town developer
Ian MacNeil (ice hockey) (born 1977), Canadian ice hockey player
Ian MacNeil (scenic designer) (born 1960), British scenic designer, the son of Robert MacNeil
Ian Roderick Macneil (1929–2010), American legal scholar
John MacNeil (1854–1896), Scottish/Australian evangelist
Joseph MacNeil (1924–2018), Canadian Roman Catholic archbishop
Karen MacNeil, American wine writer and educator
Ken MacNeil (born 1975), Canadian darts player
Kenzie MacNeil (1952–2021), Canadian songwriter and politician
Kevin MacNeil, Scottish writer and poet
Laine MacNeil (born 1996), Canadian actress
Linda MacNeil (born 1954), American jeweller
Maggie MacNeil (born 2000), Canadian swimmer
Mick MacNeil (born 1958), Scottish songwriter and keyboardist
Neil MacNeil (1923–2008), American journalist
Rita MacNeil (1944–2013), Canadian folk singer
Robert MacNeil (born 1931), Canadian television journalist
Russell MacNeil (1931–2018), Canadian politician
Sarah Macneil (born 1955), Australian Anglican bishop
Sheila MacNeil, Scottish tissue engineer
Wade MacNeil (born 1984), Canadian musician
William J. MacNeil (born 1946), Canadian real estate agent and politician

As first name
MacNeil Mitchell (1904–1996), American lawyer and politician

Fictional people 
Regan MacNeil, a character from William Peter Blatty's The Exorcist, played by Linda Blair in the 1973 film

Other possible meanings 
The MacNeil/Lehrer Newshour, former name of The NewsHour with Jim Lehrer when Robert MacNeil co-anchored

See also 
McNeil (disambiguation)
McNeill (disambiguation)
MacNeill
McNeal
MacNeal
MacNeille

Surnames
Surnames of Scottish origin
Clan MacNeil
Patronymic surnames
Surnames from given names